Lamont is an unincorporated community located in southern Bolivar County, Mississippi, United States on Mississippi Highway 1 on the Bolivar County/Washington County border. Lamont is located at the junction of two branches of the former Yazoo and Mississippi Valley Railroad.

A post office first began operation under the name Lamont in 1888.

Irene Scruggs, a Piedmont blues and country blues singer, was born in Lamont.

References

Unincorporated communities in Bolivar County, Mississippi
Unincorporated communities in Mississippi